Nagole is a residential and commercial locality in Uppal mandal, Medchal district, Telangana, India.

Locality
The locality is contiguous with the arterial Inner Ring Road of Hyderabad. The locality witnessed growth in the early nineties as a housing destination for the middle class. By the late 2000s, this locality's real estate grew further in value with the announcement of Hyderabad Metro in its proximity and growing infrastructure.

Transport
Nagole is connected to several parts of the city through Telangana State Road Transport Corporation City Buses.

An elevated Metro Rail station for Nagole opened on 28 November 2017. The Metro Rail corridor terminates at Nagole and falls under the Blue Line Corridor of the transport system.

References

Neighbourhoods in Hyderabad, India
Municipal wards of Hyderabad, India